NA-206 Naushahro Feroze-II is a constituency for the National Assembly of Pakistan.

Election 2002 

General elections were held on 10 Oct 2002. Abdul Ghaffar Khan Jatoi of National Alliance won by 83,043 votes.

Election 2008 

General elections were held on 18 Feb 2008. Ghulam Murtaza Khan Jatoi of National Peoples Party won by 109,319 votes.

Election 2013 

General elections were held on 11 May 2013. Ghulam Murtaza Khan Jatoi of National Peoples Party won by 83,960 votes and became the  member of National Assembly.

Election 2018 

General elections are scheduled to be held on 25 July 2018.

See also
NA-205 Naushahro Feroze-I
NA-207 Nawabshah-I

References

External links 
Election result's official website

NA-211